The Helsinki Treaty on cooperation between Denmark, Finland, Iceland, Norway and Sweden set the framework for Nordic cooperation in the Nordic Council and the Nordic Council of Ministers. The Treaty was signed on 23 March 1962 and entered into force on 1 July 1962. It was amended in 1971, 1974, 1983, 1985, 1991, and 1995. The most recent amendments entered into force on 2 January 1996.

The preamble to the agreement states, among other things, that the Nordic countries:

 will promote the close community that exists between the Nordic peoples in culture as well as in law and society.
 aims to implement uniform laws in the Nordic countries in as many ways as possible.
 wishes to renew and develop Nordic cooperation in the light of the Nordic countries' increased participation in European cooperation.

References

External links
 norden.org – Helsinki Treaty

20th-century treaties
Nordic Council